The Women's Auxiliary Air Force (WAAF), whose members were referred to as WAAFs, was the female auxiliary of the Royal Air Force during World War II. Established in 1939, WAAF numbers exceeded 180,000 at its peak strength in 1943, with over 2,000 women enlisting per week.

History

A Women's Royal Air Force had existed from 1918 to 1920. The WAAF was created on 28 June 1939, absorbing the forty-eight RAF companies of the Auxiliary Territorial Service which had existed since 1938. Conscription of women did not begin until 1941. It only applied to those between 20 and 30 years of age and they had the choice of the auxiliary services or factory work.

Women recruited into the WAAF were given basic training at one of five sites, though not all of the sites ran training simultaneously. The five sites were at West Drayton, Harrogate, Bridgnorth, Innsworth and Wilmslow. All WAAF basic recruit training was located at Wilmslow from 1943.

WAAFs did not serve as aircrew. The use of women pilots was limited to the Air Transport Auxiliary (ATA), which was civilian. Although they did not participate in active combat, they were exposed to the same dangers as any on the "home front" working at military installations. They were active in parachute packing and the crewing of barrage balloons in addition to performing catering, meteorology, radar, aircraft maintenance, transport, communications duties including wireless telephonic and telegraphic operation. They worked with codes and ciphers, analysed reconnaissance photographs, and performed intelligence operations. WAAFs were a vital presence in the control of aircraft, both in radar stations and iconically as plotters in operation rooms, most notably during the Battle of Britain. These operation rooms directed fighter aircraft against the Luftwaffe, mapping both home and enemy aircraft positions.

Air Force nurses belonged to Princess Mary's Royal Air Force Nursing Service instead. Female medical and dental officers were commissioned into the Royal Air Force and held RAF ranks.

WAAFs were paid two-thirds of the pay of male counterparts in RAF ranks.

By the end of World War II, WAAF enrolment had declined and the effect of demobilisation was to take the vast majority out of the service. The remainder, now only several hundred strong, was renamed the Women's Royal Air Force on 1 February 1949.

Directors

On 1 July 1939, Jane Trefusis Forbes was made Director of WAAF, with the rank of Senior Controller, later, Air Commandant. On 1 January 1943 she was appointed to the rank of Air Chief Commandant with its creation. On 4 October 1943, while Forbes toured Canada, assessing the Royal Canadian Air Force Women's Division, she was relieved by Princess Alice, Duchess of Gloucester, who had been head of the WAAF since 1939, again with the rank of Senior Controller, then, Air Commandant, being gazetted to Air Chief Commandant on 22 March 1943. Forbes retired in August 1944, and the post of director was given to Mary Welsh, who was appointed Air Chief Commandant. After the war, the rank of Air Chief Commandant was suspended and in December 1946, the final director of WAAF, Felicity Hanbury, was appointed.

Air Chief Commandant Dame Jane Trefusis Forbes, June 1939 – 4 October 1943
Air Chief Commandant Princess Alice, Duchess of Gloucester, 4 October 1943 – August 1944
Air Chief Commandant Dame Mary Welsh, August 1944 – November 1946
Air Commandant Dame Felicity Hanbury, December 1946 – January 1949

Ranks
Initially, the WAAF used the ATS ranking system, although the director held the rank of senior controller (equivalent to brigadier in the British Army and air commodore in the RAF) instead of chief controller (equivalent to major-general or air vice-marshal) as in the ATS. However, in December 1939 the title was changed to air commandant, when the ranks were renamed and reorganised. Other ranks now held identical ranks to male RAF personnel, but officers continued to have a separate rank system, although now different from that of the ATS. From February 1940 it was no longer possible to enter directly as an officer; from that time all officers were appointed from the other ranks. From July 1941 WAAF officers held full commissions. On 1 January 1943, the rank of air chief commandant (equivalent to air vice-marshal) was created with the director's appointment to that rank.

Officers

Other ranks

WAAFs serving with SOE 
Several members of the WAAF served with the Special Operations Executive during the Second World War.

 Assistant Section Officer Noor Inayat Khan (9901), posthumously Mentioned in Dispatches and awarded the French Croix de Guerre with Gold Star and the George Cross, Britain's highest award for gallantry not in the face of the enemy.
 Section Officer Yvonne Baseden
 Section Officer Yolande Beekman, posthumously awarded the French Croix de Guerre.
 Assistant Section Officer Sonya Butt (9910)
 Section Officer Muriel Byck
 Flight Officer Yvonne Cormeau, awarded the MBE, the Légion d'honneur, Croix de Guerre and Médaille combattant volontaire de la Résistance.
 Flight Officer Alix D'Unienville
 Flight Officer Krystyna Skarbek (aka Christine Granville), awarded the OBE, George Medal and Croix de Guerre.
 Section Officer Mary Katherine Herbert
 Section Officer Phyllis Latour
 Section Officer Cecily Lefort, posthumously awarded the French Croix de Guerre.
 Section Officer Patricia O'Sullivan
 Sergeant Haviva Reik (aka Ada Robinson)
 Assistant Section Officer Lilian Rolfe, posthumously awarded the MBE and the Croix de Guerre.
 Section Officer Diana Rowden, posthumously awarded the MBE and the Croix de Guerre.
 Section Officer Anne-Marie Walters, awarded the MBE.

Flying Nightingales
Nursing Orderlies of the WAAF flew on RAF transport planes to evacuate the wounded from the Normandy battlefields. They were dubbed Flying Nightingales by the press. The RAF Air Ambulance Unit flew under 46 Group Transport Command from RAF Down Ampney, RAF Broadwell, and RAF Blakehill Farm. RAF Dakota aircraft carried military supplies and ammunition so could not display the Red Cross.

Training for air ambulance nursing duties included instruction in the use of oxygen, injections, learning how to deal with certain types of injuries such as broken bones, missing limb cases, head injuries, burns and colostomies; and to learn the effects of air travel and altitude.

In October 2008 the seven nurses still living were presented with lifetime achievement awards by the Duchess of Cornwall.

Gallery

See also

 Air Transport Auxiliary
 Auxiliary Territorial Service
 National Association of Training Corps for Girls
 Women Airforce Service Pilots (US)
 Women's Army Corps (US)
 Women's Auxiliary Australian Air Force
 Women's Royal Naval Service
 Military ranks of women's services in WWII

Notes

References

Further reading
Escott, Beryl, Women in Air Force Blue, Patrick Stephens, 1989. 
Escott, Beryl, Our Wartime Days, The WAAF in World War II, Sutton Publishing Ltd, 1995. 
Escott, Beryl, The WAAF : A History of the Women’s Auxiliary Air Force, Shire Publications, 2003.
Gane Pushman, Muriel, We All Wore Blue: Experiences in the WAAF, Tempus, 2006. 
Halsall, Christine, Women of Intelligence. Winning the Second World War with Air Photos, The History Press, 2012. 
Manning, Mick & Granström, Brita: Taff in the WAAF (English Association Award Winner), Janetta Otter-Barry Books (Frances Lincoln), 2010.  
Rice, Joan, Sand In My Shoes: Coming of Age in the Second World War: Wartime Diaries of a WAAF, Harperpress, 2006. 
 Settle, Mary Lee, All the Brave Promises: The Memories of Aircraft Woman 2nd Class 2146391 (1966)
 Stone, Tessa. "Creating A (Gendered?) Military Identity: The Women's Auxiliary Air Force in Great Britain in the Second World War", Women's History Review, October 1999, Vol. 8, Issue 4, pp. 605–624, scholarly study

Watkins, Elizabeth, Cypher Officer, Pen Press Publications, Brighton, 2008.  A first-hand account by a young WAAF cypher officer on active duty in the Egypt, Kenya, the Seychelles and Italy in World War II.
Wyndham J., Love is Blue, Heinemann, 1986. 
Younghusband, Eileen, Not an Ordinary Life. How Changing Times Brought Historical Events into my Life, Cardiff Centre for Lifelong Learning, Cardiff, 2009.  (Pages 36–70, 251–55 and 265–67 describe the experiences of a WAAF radar Filterer in World War II.)
Younghusband, Eileen, One Woman's War, Candy Jar Books, 2011.

External links

The WRAF - Women in the Blue: Working through the Second War years—Royal Air Force official website
The Work of Women in the Women's Auxiliary Air Force, The Second World War Experience Centre, Leeds UK
"Women as Ground Crews", reproduced from The Aeroplane, No.1686, 17 September 1943
WAAF Association
Girlfriends, a musical about WAAFs by Howard Goodall: the website includes research material
Early Radar Memories; Sgt. Jean (Sally) Semple, one of Britain’s pioneer Radar Operators Retrieved: 22 June 2008
One Woman's War. Website of former WAAF Officer Eileen Younghusband's latest book 'One Woman's War'.
Women's Auxiliary Air Force from the IBCC Digital Archive at the University of Lincoln.

All-female military units and formations
Military units and formations established in 1939
Military units and formations of the United Kingdom in World War II
Royal Air Force
British women in World War II
1939 establishments in the United Kingdom
Women's organisations based in the United Kingdom